Reinaldo Marcus Green (born 1981) is an American director, producer and writer. His films include Monsters and Men (2018), Joe Bell (2020), and King Richard (2021), which was nominated for Best Picture at the 94th Academy Awards.

Early life
Green was born in the Bronx to an African American father and a Puerto Rican mother and grew up in Staten Island among other areas of New York City. His parents divorced, and he and his brother Rashaad primarily lived with their father. They played baseball growing up and had MLB ambitions.

Green attended Port Richmond High School. He went on to complete a Master of Education at Fairleigh Dickinson University, and taught at an elementary school. He then worked at AIG for five years as a director of educational programming and talent acquisitions, needing the money to pay off his undergraduate loans. However, Green's department was downsized due to the financial crisis of 2007–2008.

Disillusioned by Wall Street and introduced to film by his brother, Green enrolled in NYU Tisch School of the Arts' graduate film program when he was 27 and has since taught at the institution as an adjunct professor.

Career
Green first gained prominence through his early short films both solo and in collaboration with his brother. Among these were Stone Cars, which was shot on location in Cape Town, South Africa and showcased at the 2014 Cinéfondation in Cannes, and Stop, which was inspired by the killing of Trayvon Martin and premiered at the 2015 Sundance Film Festival.

After receiving the Sundance Institute Fellowship in 2017, Green made his feature film debut with the 2018 drama Monsters and Men, which won the Special Jury Award for Outstanding First Feature at the Sundance Film Festival. His next project was Joe Bell, produced by Jake Gyllenhaal and Cary Joji Fukunaga, and starring Mark Wahlberg, Connie Britton, and Maxwell Jenkins.

For his first television project, Green directed three episodes of the British crime drama Top Boy for its third series, which premiered in 2019.

In June 2019, it was announced Green would be directing a biopic titled King Richard, about tennis coach and father of American tennis players Venus and Serena Williams, Richard Williams, starring Will Smith in the titular role. The film has received a number of accolades.

Green directed the HBO miniseries We Own This City, based on the nonfiction book of the same name by Justin Fenton. He is attached to direct the upcoming Bob Marley biopic starring Kingsley Ben-Adir for Paramount Pictures as well as an untitled dramedy for Lionsgate.

Filmography 

Short film

Film

Television

References

External links
 

Living people
1981 births
American people of Puerto Rican descent
African-American film directors
African-American educators
Fairleigh Dickinson University alumni
People from the Bronx
People from Staten Island
Tisch School of the Arts alumni
Tisch School of the Arts faculty